Shirley Povich Field is a baseball stadium in Rockville, Maryland. It is the home field of the Bethesda Big Train of the Cal Ripken Collegiate Baseball League, and the home field of the Georgetown Hoyas of the Big East Conference. The stadium holds 800 spectators.  It is named after Washington Post columnist Shirley Povich. The stadium was created by renovating an existing field at Cabin John Regional Park between December 1998 and June 1999.

As part of an exhibition series to prepare for the Olympics in Japan, the Israel National Baseball Team played Bethesda Big Train in a Friendship Game at Povich Field on July 18, 2021.  Team Israel came from behind in the final inning to beat the Big Train 8-7 before a standing room only crowd of 835.

See also
 List of NCAA Division I baseball venues

References

External links
Venue information

College baseball venues in the United States
Georgetown Hoyas baseball
Baseball venues in Maryland
Sports venues in the Washington metropolitan area
1999 establishments in Maryland
Sports venues completed in 1999